Bannikovia is an extinct genus of shrimp in the order Decapoda. It existed in Russia during the Lower Miocene period.

References

Caridea
Miocene crustaceans
Fossils of Russia